Khorusan (also Romanized as Khorūsān, Khoroosan, Khowrīshān, and Khurīshān) is a village in Japelaq-e Sharqi Rural District, Japelaq District, Azna County, Lorestan Province, Iran. At the 2006 census, its population was 277, in 74 families.

References 

Towns and villages in Azna County